Michel Meylan (27 January 1939 – 3 July 2020) was a French politician.

Biography
In 1955, at the age of 15, Meylan organized a trip for his Scouting troop to attend the World Scout Jamboree in Canada. Forty years later, he created the Amicale parlementaire scoute in France, which he chaired. This helped him attend meetings with other international scouting organizations in Guadalajara, Manila, and Warsaw.

In 1959, Meylan began fighting in the Algerian War. He obtained the rank of second lieutenant following his training. He used his military service to his advantage in his political career as a member of the Cultural, Family and Social Affairs Committee in the National Assembly. He started his political career with the Independent Republicans (RI) party, which his family had been a part of for over 70 years. However, when he was elected as Mayor of Bonneville and represented Haute-Savoie's 3rd constituency in the National Assembly, he was a member of the Union for French Democracy (UDF).

As Mayor of Bonneville, Meylan developed the commune's business district and established the first municipal employment center in France. Meylan created sister cities of Bonneville, such as Racconigi in Italy and Téra in Niger. The move with Téra helped improve Franco-Nigerien relations and human development improved in the African city.

In 1997, Meylan made a controversial statement in the National Assembly amidst a debate on the civil solidarity pact, saying "If there are queers here, I piss them off".

Michel Meylan died on 3 July 2020 at the age of 81.

References

1939 births
2020 deaths
20th-century French politicians
21st-century French politicians
Union for French Democracy politicians
People from Ain